Lorenzo Sonego defeated Alexander Bublik in the final, 7–6(7–3), 6–2 to win the singles tennis title at the 2022 Moselle Open.

Hubert Hurkacz was the defending champion, but lost in the semifinals to Sonego.

Seeds
The top four seeds received a bye into the second round.

Draw

Finals

Top half

Bottom half

Qualifying

Seeds

Qualifiers

Qualifying draw

First qualifier

Second qualifier

Third qualifier

Fourth qualifier

References

External links
 Main draw
 Qualifying draw

2022 ATP Tour